TCV SUJA is a branch of Tibetan Children's Villages School in Mandi, India. It was founded in 1986. It has a population of 858, including 797 children and 61 staff.

References

Schools in Mandi district
Mandi, Himachal Pradesh
Educational institutions established in 1986
1986 establishments in Himachal Pradesh
Education in Tibet